Rice Bastion is a substantial mountain mass surmounted by a small crown of exposed rock which appears slightly higher than the plateau behind it, projecting from the edge of Detroit Plateau, Nordenskjöld Coast in Graham Land.  Situated between the upper courses of Darvari Glacier and  Boryana Glacier, 8 miles (13 km) southwest of Mount Elliott and 8.8 miles (14 km) north-northwest of Fothergill Point. Mapped from surveys by Falkland Islands Dependencies Survey (FIDS) (1960–61). Named by United Kingdom Antarctic Place-Names Committee (UK-APC) for Lee Rice, FIDS surveyor at Hope Bay (1957–58), who worked in this area.

References
 SCAR Composite Antarctic Gazetteer.

Mountains of Graham Land
Nordenskjöld Coast